The fifty-fifth Parliament of the United Kingdom was the legislature of the United Kingdom following the 2010 general election of members of parliament (MPs) to the House of Commons. Parliament, which consists of the House of Lords and the elected House of Commons, was convened on 25 May 2010 at the Palace of Westminster by Queen Elizabeth II. It was dissolved on 30 March 2015, being 25 working days ahead of the 2015 general election on 7 May 2015.

The election saw each of Parliament's 650 constituencies return one MP to the House of Commons. The Conservative Party, led by David Cameron, became the single largest party, though without an overall majority. This resulted in a hung parliament. A coalition agreement was then formed following negotiations with Liberal Democrats and their leader Nick Clegg. John Bercow resumed his role as Speaker of the House of Commons. In September 2010, Ed Miliband won a Labour Party leadership vote to succeed Gordon Brown as permanent Leader of the Opposition.

House of Commons composition
This is a graphical representation of the House of Commons showing a comparison of party strengths as it was directly after the 2010 general election:

The Scottish National Party and Plaid Cymru sit together as a party group.
Sinn Féin has not taken its seats.
This is not the official seating plan of the House of Commons, which has five rows of benches on each side, with the government party to the right of the Speaker and opposition parties to the left, but with room for only around two-thirds of MPs to sit at any one time.

This table shows the number of MPs in each party:

Notes
See here for a full list of changes during the fifty-fifth Parliament.
The actual government majority is calculated as Conservative and Liberal Democrat MPs less all other parties. This calculation excludes the Speaker, Deputy Speakers (two Labour and one Conservative) and Sinn Féin.

List of MPs first elected in the 2010 general election
The following table is a list of MPs who were first elected in 2010, ordered by constituency.

References

External links
General Election 2010 – Results BBC News
Full election data as a spreadsheet, The Guardian

See also 

 List of new members of the 112th United States Congress (also elected in 2010)

2010 United Kingdom general election
2010
Lists of UK MPs 2010–2015
Lists of new members of legislatures